This list of bridges in Austria lists bridges of particular historical, scenic, architectural or engineering interest. Road and railway bridges, viaducts, aqueducts and footbridges are included.

Historical and architectural interest bridges

Major road and railway bridges 
This table presents the structures with spans greater than 100 meters (non-exhaustive list).

Notes and references 
 Notes

 

 Others references

See also 

 Transport in Austria
 Roads in Austria
 Rail transport in Austria
 Geography of Austria
 List of crossings of the Danube
 :de:Wiener Donaubrücken  - Vienna Danube Bridges
 List of bridges by district of Vienna: de:1st, Innere Stadt, de:2nd, Leopoldstadt, de:3rd, Landstraße, de:4th, Wieden, de:5th, Margareten, de:6th, Mariahilf, de:7th, Neubau, de:8th, Josefstadt, de:9th, Alsergrund, de:10th, Favoriten, de:11th, Simmering, de:12th, Meidling, de:13th, Hietzing, de:14th, Penzing, de:15th, Rudolfsheim-Fünfhaus, de:16th, Ottakring, de:17th, Hernals, de:18th, Währing, de:19th, Döbling, de:20th, Brigittenau, de:21st, Floridsdorf, de:22nd, Donaustadt, de:23rd, Liesing
 :de:Liste der Brücken in Linz  - List of bridges in Linz
 :de:Liste der Fußgängerbrücken in Graz  - List of footbridges in Graz
 :de:Brücken Salzburgs  - Salzburg Bridges
 :de:Liste der höchsten Brücken in Österreich  - List of highest bridges in Austria

External links

Further reading 
 
 
 
 
 
 

Austria
 
Bridges
Bridges